The Commander-in-Chief of Myanmar Army is the highest ranking military officer of the Myanmar Army. Up until 1990, Myanmar Armed Forces has Chief of Staff system and Myanmar Army was led by Vice Chief of Staff (Army). A new system was introduced in 1990 during Armed Forces reorganisation and all three branches of Armed Forces are now led by the Commander-in-Chief. The Commander-in-Chief of Myanmar Army also traditionally serves as Deputy Commander-in-Chief.

List of chiefs

Vice Chief of Staff (1948–1990)

Commander-in-Chief of Myanmar Army (1990–present)

See also
Myanmar Army

References

Military of Myanmar
Myanmar